Montassar Triki (Arabic: مُنتَصَّر التريكي; born 29 August 2001) is a Tunisian professional footballer who plays as a midfielder for AS Soliman on loan from Espérance de Tunis.

References

2001 births
Living people
Association football midfielders
Tunisian footballers
Espérance Sportive de Tunis players
AS Soliman players
Tunisian Ligue Professionnelle 1 players